Klam is a municipality in the district Perg in the Austrian state of Upper Austria.

Population

References

Cities and towns in Perg District